Lee Jung-gook (born August 20, 1957) is a South Korean film director and screenwriter. Lee's feature debut Song of Resurrection (1990) was banned as its plot deals with the 1980 Gwangju Uprising. He won critical acclaim for his second feature The Story of Two Women (1994) by winning numerous awards at the 32nd Grand Bell Awards, including Best Film, Best New Director and Best New Actress, and Best New Director at the 14th Korean Association of Film Critics Awards in 1994. A Thai version of The Letter was made in 2004, with the same title.

Filmography 
Daydream (short film, 1984) - director, screenwriter, producer, editor 
The Fire of Tandra (1984) - assistant director
I Stand Everyday (1990) - screenwriter
Song of Resurrection (1990) - director, screenwriter
Song of Resurrection (1993) - director, screenwriter
The Story of Two Women (1994) - director, script editor
The Man in the Sun (1994) - screenwriter
Channel 69 (1996) - director, script editor
The Letter (1997) - director, screenwriter
Promenade (2000) - director, screenwriter
Blue (2003) - director
Mandarin Ghost (short film, 2006) - director, music director, producer, screenwriter
Resurrection of the Butterfly (2007) - director, script editor

Awards 
1994 14th Korean Association of Film Critics Awards: Best New Director (The Story of Two Women)

References

External links 
 
 
 

1957 births
Living people
South Korean film directors
South Korean screenwriters